This article lists countries alphabetically, with total  tax revenue as a percentage of gross domestic product (GDP) for the listed countries. The tax percentage for each country listed in the source has been added to the chart.

Tax as % of GDP (2020)

See also
List of countries by government budget
List of countries by government spending as percentage of GDP
List of countries by social welfare spending
Taxation in the United States
List of countries by tax rates
Tax rates in Europe

References 

Tax Revenue To Gdp Ratio
Gross domestic product
Tax Revenue To Gdp Ratio